Trichosolen is a genus of green algae in the family Bryopsidaceae.

References

Bryopsidales genera
Taxa named by Camille Montagne